Dorothy Kirsten (July 6, 1910, Montclair, New Jersey – November 18, 1992, Los Angeles, California) was an American operatic soprano.

Biography
Kirsten's mother was an organist and music teacher, her grandfather was a conductor, and her great-aunt, Catherine Hayes, was also an opera singer. She left high school at age 16 and worked for the Singer Corporation sewing machine company and for New Jersey Bell, studying voice in her spare time. Her teacher, Louis Darnay, eventually employed her as a secretary and maid.

By the late 1930s she had an ongoing professional career as a radio singer on WINS, a member of the Kate Smith Chorus, and as a vocalist for pop orchestras. She mentored under Grace Moore from 1938, who had her study in Rome with Astolfo Pescia. Her time in Europe was cut by the outbreak of World War II, and she returned in 1939, debuting at the New York World's Fair. Roles followed at the Chicago Opera Company (Manon, 1940), San Carlo Opera Company (1942), New York City Opera (1943), San Francisco Opera (1945), and New York Philharmonic (1945). Her radio program "Keepsakes" ran for a year in 1943–44.

Kirsten joined the roster of principal sopranos at the Philadelphia La Scala Opera Company (PLSOC) in 1943 and spent much of her time performing there through 1947. She made her debut with the company in an out-of-town performance at the Syria Mosque in Pittsburgh on May 18, 1943 as Mimì in Giacomo Puccini's La bohème with Nino Martini as Rodolfo, Carlo Morelli as Marcello, and Armand Balendonck conducting. 

In the 1943–1944 PLSOC season at the Academy of Music she portrayed Mimì many times and sang Nedda in Pagliacci with Giovanni Martinelli as Canio. She also toured with the company to Detroit in October 1943, singing Mimì to Armand Tokatyan's Rodolfo. Kirsten opened the PLSOC's 1944–1945 season singing Micaëla in Georges Bizet's Carmen with Bruna Castagna in the title role. She also toured with company to Cleveland singing Mimì.

In February 1946 she traveled with PLSOC to Washington D.C. to perform Marguerite in Charles Gounod's Faust. In December 1949 she recorded Manon Lescaut with the world-renowned tenor Jussi Björling. Her final year performing with the PLSOC was the 1946–1947 season, portraying Cio-cio-san in Madama Butterfly and Juliette in Roméo et Juliette. 

Kirsten debuted at the Metropolitan Opera with the role of Mimi in La bohème on December 1, 1945, and continued to sing with the Met for the next thirty years. While she performed primarily in the United States, she did perform in Europe at times, and gave performances in the USSR in 1962, singing Violetta in La traviata at the Bolshoi Opera. She sang in the American premieres of William Walton's Troilus and Cressida and Francis Poulenc's Dialogues of the Carmelites in San Francisco.  Her last performance with the Met was on February 10, 1979 as the title role in Tosca.

In addition to her operatic activities, she sang on radio with Frank Sinatra (co-starring with him in Light-Up Time), Bing Crosby, Nelson Eddy, Jack Benny, Gordon MacRae, and Perry Como. She also appeared in two films, Mr. Music (1950) and The Great Caruso (1951). In 1965, she appeared on the Firestone album series Your Favorite Christmas Music, Volume 4, singing "I Wonder as I Wander" and "Joy to the World".

She published the autobiography A Time to Sing in 1982. She was married three times. Her first marriage was to Edward MacKayes Oates, with a divorce in 1949; the second to Eugene Chapman in 1951, who died three years later; and the third to neurosurgeon Douglas French, who died in 1989. She suffered a stroke on November 5, 1992 and died of complications on November 18, 1992. She is interred at Forest Lawn Memorial Park in Glendale, California. Her papers currently are housed at the Howard Gotlieb Archival Research Center at Boston University.

Filmography

References

External links
Interview with Dorothy Kirsten by Bruce Duffie, June 26, 1985

1910 births
1992 deaths
American operatic sopranos
Singers from New Jersey
People from Montclair, New Jersey
Burials at Forest Lawn Memorial Park (Glendale)
20th-century American women opera singers
Classical musicians from New Jersey